María José “Maca” López Bellatín (born 22 May 1985) is a Peruvian professional footballer who plays as an attacking midfielder for Ecuadorian club Deportivo Cuenca and the Peru women's national team.

International career
López played for Peru at senior level in the 2019 Pan American Games.

References

1985 births
Living people
Footballers from Lima
Peruvian women's footballers
Women's association football midfielders
Sporting Cristal footballers
Botafogo de Futebol e Regatas players
Campeonato Brasileiro de Futebol Feminino Série A1 players
Peru women's international footballers
Pan American Games competitors for Peru
Footballers at the 2019 Pan American Games
Peruvian expatriate footballers
Peruvian expatriate sportspeople in Brazil
Expatriate women's footballers in Brazil
Peruvian expatriate sportspeople in Ecuador
Expatriate women's footballers in Ecuador
Peruvian sports journalists